During the 2003–04 English football season, Portsmouth F.C. competed in the Premier League. It was their first ever season in the Premiership and the first in English football's top flight since the 1987–88 season.

Season summary
Portsmouth's Premiership debut (and only their second top division campaign during the last 45 years) was a fine one, as they finished 13th and established Fratton Park as one of the hardest Premiership grounds to get a result at. Only their dismal away form (with only two away wins all season) prevented them from finishing even higher and challenging for a European place, but it was still a very good season for the only newly promoted side to preserve their Premiership status.

After a good start to the season which saw Portsmouth top of the Premiership after three games, the team slumped into the relegation zone, but rallied and only lost one of their last ten matches to finish 13th – ahead of more established sides like Everton, Manchester City, Blackburn Rovers and Tottenham Hotspur. To their credit, they were one of the only two teams to remain unbeaten against Arsenal's "Invincibles" in the league during the season.

Final league table

Kit
Portsmouth introduced a new kit for the season, still manufactured under the club's own brand, Pompey Sport. ty remained the kit sponsors.

Players

First-team squad

Left club during season

Reserve squad
The following players did not appear for the first-team this season.

Transfers

In
  Patrik Berger –  Liverpool, free, 6 June 2003
  Dejan Stefanović –  Vitesse Arnhem, £1,850,000, 20 June 2003
  Boris Živković –  Bayer Leverkusen, free, 24 June 2003
  Teddy Sheringham,  Tottenham Hotspur, free, 30 June 2003
  Amdy Faye –  Auxerre, undisclosed (estimated £1,500,000), 5 August 2003
  Alexey Smertin –  Chelsea, season loan, 27 August 2003
  Pavel Srníček –  Brescia, free, 1 September 2003
  Eyal Berkovic –  Manchester City, £500,000, 8 January 2004
  Richard Duffy –  Swansea City, undisclosed (six-figure sum), 26 January 2004,
  Sebastian Olszar –  Admira Wacker Mödling, free, 26 January 2004
  Ivica Mornar –  Anderlecht, £400,000, 29 January 2004
  Lomana Tresor LuaLua –  Newcastle United, three-month loan,  £100,000 loan fee, 2 February 2004
  John Curtis –  Leicester City, free, 2 February 2004
  Vincent Péricard –  Juventus, July 2003
  Harald Wapenaar –  Utrecht, 2003
  Jason Roberts –  West Bromwich Albion, loan, 2003
  Petri Pasanen –  Ajax Amsterdam, 2004
  Sébastien Schemmel –  West Ham United
  Alan Knight – free

Out
  Justin Edinburgh – released (later joined  Billericay Town), 2003
  Jason Crowe – released (later joined  Grimsby Town), 20 May 2003
  Luke Nightingale – released (later joined  Southend United), 20 May 2003
  Carl Tiler – retired, 20 May 2003
  Gianluca Festa –  Cagliari, 13 June 2003
  Paul Merson –  Walsall, undisclosed, 18 July 2003
  Rowan Vine –  Colchester United, season loan, 7 August 2003
  Carl Robinson –  Rotherham United, month loan, 18 September 2003
  Boris Živković –  Stuttgart, free, 13 January 2004
  Jamie Vincent –  Derby County, free, 16 January 2004
  Neil Barrett –  Dundee, loan, 23 January 2004
  Carl Robinson –  Sheffield United, loan, 30 January 2004
  Pavel Srníček –  West Ham United, month loan, 19 February 2004
  Lee Bradbury –  Walsall, free, 25 March 2004
  Lewis Buxton –  AFC Bournemouth, season loan, October 2003
  Yoshi Kawaguchi –  FC Nordsjælland
  Jason Roberts –  West Bromwich Albion, loan ended
  Courtney Pitt –  Coventry City, loan
  Courtney Pitt –  Luton Town, loan
  Lassina Diabaté –  AC Ajaccio

Results

Premier League

Results per matchday

FA Cup

League Cup

Awards
 August: Player of the Month, Teddy Sheringham
 April: Manager of the Month, Harry Redknapp

Statistics

Appearances and goals

|-
! colspan=14 style=background:#dcdcdc; text-align:center| Goalkeepers

|-
! colspan=14 style=background:#dcdcdc; text-align:center| Defenders

|-
! colspan=14 style=background:#dcdcdc; text-align:center| Midfielders

|-
! colspan=14 style=background:#dcdcdc; text-align:center| Forwards

|-
! colspan=14 style=background:#dcdcdc; text-align:center| Players transferred out during the season

|}

Notes

References

Portsmouth F.C. seasons
Portsmouth